Ghaida Rinawie Zoabi (born 28 September 1972) is an Israeli Arab activist, politician and diplomat. She was a member of the Knesset representing Meretz from  2021 to 2022.

Biography
Zoabi was born in Nazareth, the eldest daughter of a nephrologist who was amongst the founders of the dialysis department at the EMMS Nazareth Hospital and a homemaker. She attended St Joseph's School and then studied for a bachelor's degree in Hebrew literature and psychology at the Hebrew University of Jerusalem. She later earned a master's degree in literature at the University of Haifa, and founded Injaz, the Centre for Professional Arab Local Governance. She became a member of the board of directors at Ruppin Academic Center and served on the Prime Minister's Round Table for Emergency Preparedness. She was selected by TheMarker as one of the 100 most influential people in Israel in 2011, while Forbes listed her as one of the 50 most important women in the Israeli economy in 2018. In 2015 she was the first Arab woman to win the Proper Government award.

Prior to the 2021 elections she was placed fourth on the Meretz list. During the election campaign she was criticised after stating that, out of respect for the Arab sector of Israel, she would abstain from voting on any legislation banning conversion therapy, later saying she would support legislation that supported LGBTQ rights. She was elected to the Knesset as the party won six seats.

In February 2022, Zoabi was appointed consul-general to Shanghai, becoming the first Israeli-Arab woman to serve as a senior diplomat. The appointment was delayed. On 19 May, she resigned from the coalition, lowering its number to a minority of 59 but rejoined the coalition three days later.

As of 2022, she resides in Nof HaGalil.

References

External links

1972 births
Living people
21st-century Israeli women politicians
Arab members of the Knesset
Hebrew University of Jerusalem alumni
Israeli activists
Israeli women activists
Members of the 24th Knesset (2021–2022)
Meretz politicians
People from Nazareth
University of Haifa alumni
Women members of the Knesset
Israeli consuls
Israeli women diplomats